Miquel Robusté Colomer (born 20 May 1985) is a Spanish footballer who plays for UE Vilassar de Mar as a central defender.

Club career
Born in Vilassar de Mar, Barcelona, Catalonia, Robusté a started his career at the second biggest club in Barcelona, RCD Espanyol. He played for both  Juvenil teams during 2003–04 and was a regular of the reserves in his three-season spell, with 21 Segunda División B appearances in his second year, suffering relegation.

Robusté was loaned to Polideportivo Ejido of the Segunda División for the 2006–07 campaign, and played 30 official games for the Andalusia side. In the summer of 2007 he was released by Espanyol with only one competitive appearance to his credit – one minute in the 2–0 away win against Cádiz CF in the quarter-finals of the Copa del Rey– and joined Levante UD of La Liga.

Due to the club's severe financial crisis, Robusté was propelled into the first team, making his top-flight debut on 30 March 2008 in a 2–1 away defeat to UD Almería. On 22 May 2010, with the team again in division two, he scored twice in a 5–3 victory over FC Cartagena, as the Valencians eventually finished third and promoted.

On 10 August 2011, after only seven league matches with Levante, Robusté left and returned to the second tier, signing for Xerez CD late in the month. He continued competing at that level the following seasons, with SD Ponferradina.

International career
Robusté was captain of the Spain under-19 team that won the 2004 UEFA European Championship. He also represented the nation at the 2005 FIFA World Youth Championship.

Club statistics

Honours
Espanyol
Copa del Rey: 2005–06

Spain U19
UEFA European Under-19 Championship: 2004

References

External links

1985 births
Living people
People from Vilassar de Mar
Sportspeople from the Province of Barcelona
Spanish footballers
Footballers from Catalonia
Association football defenders
La Liga players
Segunda División players
Segunda División B players
Segunda Federación players
Tercera Federación players
RCD Espanyol B footballers
RCD Espanyol footballers
Polideportivo Ejido footballers
Levante UD footballers
Xerez CD footballers
SD Ponferradina players
FC Cartagena footballers
CF Badalona players
UE Vilassar de Mar players
Liga II players
FC Rapid București players
Spain youth international footballers
Spanish expatriate footballers
Expatriate footballers in Romania
Spanish expatriate sportspeople in Romania